Philip Joseph Walton (born 28 March 1962) is an Irish professional golfer.

Walton attended Oklahoma State University in the United States and played for Great Britain & Ireland in the Walker Cup in 1981 and 1983. According to Ronan Rafferty, Walton had the best handicap in the Republic of Ireland as an amateur. He turned professional in 1983 and spent many years on the European Tour, making the top one hundred on the Order of Merit every year from 1983 to 1998, with a best ranking of thirteenth in 1995. He has won three European Tour events and four Irish PGA Championships.

Walton has represented Ireland or Great Britain & Ireland on many occasions. He was a member of the winning Irish team at the 1990 Alfred Dunhill Cup. He made his only Ryder Cup appearance for Europe in 1995 at Oak Hill, where he beat Jay Haas on the final green of the crucial penultimate singles match.

Walton came through Local qualifying to earn his place at the 2008 Open Championship at Royal Birkdale, his first major since 1998.

Amateur wins
1981 Scottish Amateur Stroke Play Championship, Spanish International Amateur Championship
1982 Irish Amateur Close Championship

Professional wins (7)

European Tour wins (3)

European Tour playoff record (2–1)

Other wins (4)
1987 Irish PGA Championship
1989 Irish PGA Championship
1991 Irish PGA Championship
1995 Irish PGA Championship

Results in major championships

Note: Walton never played in the Masters Tournament.

CUT = missed the half-way cut (3rd round cut in 1981 Open Championship)
WD = withdrew
"T" = tied

Team appearances
Amateur
European Youths' Team Championship (representing Ireland): 1979 (winners), 1980, 1981
Walker Cup (representing Great Britain & Ireland): 1981, 1983
European Amateur Team Championship (representing Ireland): 1981, 1983
Eisenhower Trophy (representing Great Britain & Ireland): 1982
St Andrews Trophy (representing Great Britain & Ireland): 1982

Professional
Europcar Cup (representing Ireland): 1988
Dunhill Cup (representing Ireland): 1989, 1990 (winners), 1992, 1994, 1995
Ryder Cup (representing Europe): 1995 (winners)
 Record (W–L–H) 1–1–0 = 1 pt
World Cup (representing Ireland): 1995

References

External links

Irish male golfers
Oklahoma State Cowboys golfers
European Tour golfers
PGA Tour Champions golfers
Ryder Cup competitors for Europe
Sportspeople from Dublin (city)
1962 births
Living people